Ján Čado (born 7 May 1963, in Trstena) is a retired Slovak triple jumper who represented Czechoslovakia during his active career.

His personal best results was 17.34 metres, achieved in May 1984 in Bratislava.

International competitions

References

1963 births
Living people
Czechoslovak male triple jumpers
Slovak male triple jumpers
Czechoslovak male long jumpers
Slovak male long jumpers
World Athletics Championships athletes for Czechoslovakia
People from Trstená
Sportspeople from the Žilina Region